Bilyana is a coastal locality in the Cassowary Coast Region, Queensland, Australia.

History 
Girramay (also known as Giramay, Garamay, Giramai, Keramai) is a language of Far North Queensland, particularly the area around Herbert River Catchment taking in the towns of Cardwell and Ingham. The Girramay language region includes the landscape within the local government boundaries of Cassowary Coast and Hinchinbrook Regional Councils.

Geography
The Coral Sea forms the eastern boundary, and the Murray River part of the northern.

Road infrastructure
The Bruce Highway runs through from south-west to north-west.

References 

Cassowary Coast Region
Coastline of Queensland
Localities in Queensland